Corble is a surname. Notable people with the surname include:

Archibald Corble (1883–1944), British fencer, great uncle of Simon
Simon Corble, British playwright, director, and performer

See also
Corle